Sands of Time is the debut album by the Australian power metal band Black Majesty.

Track listing
All songs written by Black Majesty, except 1, 3, 6 and 9, written by Black Majesty & Cory Betts.
 "Fall of the Reich" − 5:16
 "Legacy" − 4:16
 "Guardian" − 6:57	
 "Sands of Time" − 5:40
 "Destination" − 1:13
 "Journey's End" − 6:23
 "Colliding Worlds" − 5:12
 "No Sanctuary" − 6:44
 "Beyond Reality" − 8:19
 "Lady of the Lake" − 5:24

Credits

Band members
 John "Gio" Cavaliere − lead vocals
 Stevie Janevski − guitars, backing vocals
 Hanny Mohamed − guitars, keyboards
 Pavel Konvalinka  − drums

Additional musicians
 Evan Harris − Bass on tracks 2, 4, 5, 6, 7, 8 & 10 
 Cory Betts − Bass on tracks 1, 3 & 9
 Danny Cecati - Dual vocal on track 3
 Silvio Massaro - Dual vocal on track 7 & backing vocals on track 10
 Pep Samartino - Keyboards and backing vocals on tracks 3 & 9
 Jason Old - Backing Vocals on tracks 2, 4, 6 & 8
 Endel Rivers - Keyboards on tracks 1, 2, 4, 7 & 8
Jayden Middleton - Young boy laughing vocals

Production and other arrangements
 Endel Rivers - Engineering, Mixing, Mastering
 Dirk Illing - Cover concept, artwork
 Thomas Ewerhard - Sleeve design

References

2003 debut albums
Black Majesty albums
Limb Music albums